The 1992–1993 Jack in the Box E. coli outbreak occurred when the Escherichia coli O157:H7 bacterium (originating from contaminated beef patties) killed four children and infected 732 people across four states. The outbreak involved 73 Jack in the Box restaurants in California, Idaho, Washington, and Nevada, and has been described as "far and away the most infamous food poison outbreak in contemporary history." The majority of the affected were under 10 years old. Four children died and 178 others were left with permanent injury including kidney and brain damage.

On February 10, 1993, newly inaugurated President Bill Clinton participated in a televised town meeting program from the studios of WXYZ-TV in Detroit, Michigan. He fielded questions from the studio audience as well as studio audiences in Miami, Florida, and Seattle, Washington, and responded to questions from the parents of Riley Detwiler – the fourth and final child to die in the E. coli outbreak. The wide media coverage and scale of the outbreak were responsible for "bringing the exotic-sounding bacterium out of the lab and into the public consciousness" but it was not the first E. coli O157:H7 outbreak resulting from undercooked patties. The bacterium had previously been identified in an outbreak of food poisoning in 1982 (traced to undercooked burgers sold by McDonald's restaurants in Oregon and Michigan), and before the Jack in the Box incident there had been 22 documented outbreaks in the United States resulting in 35 deaths.

Sources
On January 12, 1993, Dr. Phil Tarr, then a pediatric gastroenterologist at the University of Washington and Seattle's Children's Hospital, filed a report with the Washington State Department of Health (DOH) about a perceived cluster of children with bloody diarrhea and Hemolytic Uremic Syndrome (HUS) likely caused by E. coli O157:H7. Dr. Tarr contacted Dr. John Kobayashi, the Washington State Epidemiologist, who started the epidemiological trace-back, linking these cases to undercooked hamburger patties.  Dr. Kobayashi recalled the conversation in an interview: "I knew that, when Phil called me,...for him to say, 'this is something that I've never seen before,' that was a big red flag."

Health inspectors traced the contamination to Jack in the Box fast food restaurants' "Monster Burger" which had been on a special promotion (using the slogan "So good it's scary!") and sold at a discounted price. The ensuing high demand "overwhelmed" the restaurants, and the product was not cooked for long enough or at a high enough temperature to kill the bacteria.

On Monday, January 18, 1993, DOH officials went public with an announcement about the source of the O157 outbreak.  This news conference took place during the Martin Luther King holiday weekend at the state lab.  After that press conference, Jack in the Box agreed to stop serving hamburgers and quarantine the meat. Only two days later, on the same day of President Bill Clinton's inauguration, a powerful storm swept through the Puget Sound area (Seattle and King County). The storm ravaged the area, knocking out power for hundreds of thousands of residents across three counties, some living in the dark for five days.  The power outage would impact proper cooking temperatures, proper refrigeration temperatures, and even proper hand-washing – all critical factors in preventing foodborne illnesses.

At a 1993 press conference the president of Foodmaker (the parent company of Jack in the Box) blamed Vons Companies (supplier of their hamburger meat) for the E. coli epidemic. Had Jack in the Box followed the state cooking standard, the outbreak would have been prevented, according to court documents and experts from the Washington State Health Department.

Subsequent investigation by the Centers for Disease Control and Prevention (CDC) identified five slaughterhouses in the United States and one in Canada as "the likely sources of ... the contaminated lots of meat." In February 1998, Foodmaker agreed to accept $58.5 million from Vons and eight other beef suppliers to settle the lawsuit started in 1993.

A total of 171 people required hospitalization. The majority of those who presented symptoms and were clinically diagnosed (but not hospitalized) were children under 10 years old.

Of the infected children 45 required hospitalization – 38 had serious kidney problems and 21 required dialysis.

Four children died:

 Six-year-old Lauren Beth Rudolph of southern California, who died on December 28, 1992, due to complications of an E. coli O157:H7 infection later tied to the same outbreak.
 Two-year-old Michael Nole of Tacoma, Washington, who died on January 22, 1993, at Children's Hospital Medical Center in Seattle of heart failure stemming from kidney failure caused by the bacteria E. coli 0157:H7.
 Two-year-old Celina Shribbs of Mountlake Terrace, Washington, who died on January 28, 1993. She became ill due to a secondary contact transmission from another child sick with E. coli.
 Seventeen-month-old Riley Detwiler of Bellingham, Washington, who died on February 20, 1993, following secondary contact (person-to-person) transmission from another child sick with E. coli. The 18-month-old boy who infected Riley had spent two days in the daycare center before a clinical laboratory could return the positive test results for E. coli. The first boy's mother suspected her son had E. coli but did not tell the daycare staff for fear that he would be sent home. When the test results came in positive for E. coli, county health officials could not reach the child's parents in the middle of the workday. Both of the first boy's parents worked at Jack in the Box, where they regularly fed their son hamburgers. Riley, on the other hand, had never eaten a hamburger. Some experts speculate that, while most media coverage focused on the company and the government – treating the affected as faceless and nameless statistics – the interaction of Riley Detwiler's parents with President Bill Clinton resulted in the national news coverage developing a human face for the events. On Tuesday, February 23, 1993, only three days after Riley's death, the American Meat Institute (AMI) sponsored an industry briefing in Chicago to discuss the E.coli O157:H7 outbreak tied to contaminated hamburgers sold at Jack in the Box. Jim Marsden, AMI's vice president for scientific and technical affairs, started off the meeting by informing the group that "Riley Detwiler, the 17-month-old son of the parents who you just saw featured at the town meeting with President Clinton, died last Saturday."<ref>{{cite news|url=http://link.galegroup.com/apps/doc/A14123275/AONE?u=mlin_b_northest&sid=AONE&xid=ed1d188a|date= April 1993|title=Solution near on 'E. coli Crisis|first=Daniel|last=Best|work=Prepared Foods. |access-date=April 15, 2019}}</ref>

 Lawsuits 
In 1993, attorney William "Bill" Marler represented the then nine-year-old Brianne Kiner in litigation against Jack in the Box following an E. coli O157:H7 outbreak, securing a $15.6 million settlement.

Marler represented hundreds of other victims of the outbreak in a class-action suit against Jack in the Box, settling for over $50 million. This was the largest payment related to foodborne illness at the time.

Legacy

Sen. Richard Durbin (D-IL), addressing a congressional hearing on food safety in 2006, described the outbreak as "a pivotal moment in the history of the beef industry." James Reagan, vice president of Research and Knowledge Management at the National Cattlemen's Beef Association (NCBA), said that the outbreak was "significant to the industry" and "the initiative that moved us further down the road [of food safety] and still drives us today." David Acheson, a former U.S. Food and Drug Administration Associate Commissioner for Foods, recently told Retro Report that "Jack in the Box was a wakeup call to many, including the regulators. You go in for a hamburger with the kids and you could die. It changed consumers' perceptions and it absolutely changed the behaviors of the industry."

As a direct result of the outbreak:
 E. coli O157:H7 was upgraded to become a reportable disease at all state health departments.
 The USDA's Food Safety and Inspection Service (FSIS) introduced safe food-handling labels for packaged raw meat and poultry retailed in supermarkets, alongside an education campaign alerting consumers to the risks associated with undercooked hamburgers.   The labels and the education campaign came with criticism and objection from the industry.
 The FSIS introduced testing for E. coli O157:H7 in ground meat.
 The United States Department of Agriculture (USDA) reclassified E. coli O157:H7 as an adulterant in ground beef.
 The USDA introduced the Pathogen Reduction and Hazard Analysis and Critical Control Points (PR/HACCP) program.
 The NCBA created a task force to fund research into the reduction of E. coli O157:H7 in cattle and slaughterhouses.
 Jack in the Box completely overhauled and restructured their corporate operations around food safety priorities, setting new standards across the fast food industry.
 Roni Rudolph, mother of Lauren Rudolph, and many other parents of affected children formed STOP Foodborne Illness (formerly Safe Tables Our Priority, or S.T.O.P.), a national non-profit organization dedicated "to prevent[ing] Americans from becoming ill and dying from foodborne illness" by advocating for sound public policy, building public awareness, and assisting those impacted by foodborne illness.
 Parents of the affected children played key roles in spreading awareness and advocating for change – speaking directly to President Bill Clinton, meeting with Vice President Al Gore, testifying before the Clinton Healthcare Task Force, working with the Secretary of Agriculture, and discussing food safety issues with lawmakers in Washington, D.C.
 Dr. Darin Detwiler, who lost his son, Riley, to E. coli and hemolytic–uremic syndrome during the outbreak, later served as a regulatory policy advisor to the USDA for meat and poultry inspection. Dr. Detwiler became a professor of Food Policy and the Director of Regulatory Affairs of Food and Food Industry at Northeastern University. In 2018, 25 years after his son's death in the outbreak, Dr. Detwiler received the Food Safety Magazine''  "Distinguished Service Award" for 25 years of contribution to food safety and policy.
 Jack in the Box launches an ad campaign which brought back original company mascot Jack as savvy no-nonsense businessman who goes to get revenge on the executives that blew him up in 1980. This campaign was intended to convince the public that they were no longer the company plagued by the food safety crisis.

See also

 List of food contamination incidents
 STOP Foodborne Illness
 1996 Odwalla E. coli outbreak

References

Bibliography

 
 
 
 
 
 
 
 
 
 
 

December 1992 events in the United States
January 1993 events in the United States
February 1993 events in the United States
1993
Health in Washington (state)
1992 disease outbreaks
1993 disease outbreaks
Food recalls
Food safety scandals
Foodborne illnesses
1993 in Washington (state)
e-coli
1993 Jack in the Box
1992 disasters in the United States
1993 disasters in the United States